Aldaier Makatindu (born 25 May 1992) is an Indonesian professional footballer who plays as a forward.

Career 
On January 14, 2015, he signed with Borneo Samarinda.

International goals 
International under-23 goals

Honours

Club
Persisam Putra Samarinda U-21
 Indonesia Super League U-21 runner-up: 2012

International
Indonesia U-23
 Islamic Solidarity Games  Silver medal: 2013

Individual
 Indonesia Super League U-21 Top Goalscorer: 2010–11, 2012

References

External links 
 
 Aldaier Makatindu at Liga Indonesia

1992 births
Living people
Sportspeople from Jakarta
Indonesian footballers
Liga 1 (Indonesia) players
Persisam Putra Samarinda players
Borneo F.C. players
Footballers at the 2014 Asian Games
Association football forwards
Asian Games competitors for Indonesia